Isadore Nordstrom (May 24, 1876 – March 6, 1930) (his first name is spelled as "Isidore" in official records) was a United States Navy sailor and a recipient of the United States military's highest decoration, the Medal of Honor.

Biography

Early career
Born on May 24, 1876, in Gothenburg, Sweden, Nordstrom immigrated to the United States and on August 17, 1897, enlisted in the Navy as an ordinary seaman from the state of New York. He served on the armored cruiser  during the Spanish–American War as part of the West Indies Naval Campaign, including the climactic Battle of Santiago de Cuba.

Medal of Honor action
On that day, while the Kearsarge was conducting target practice, powder charges were accidentally ignited in the ship's forward turret, and Nordstrom helped carry out wounded sailors. For these actions, he was awarded the Medal of Honor eighteen years later, on December 4, 1924. His first name was spelled "Isidor" on the citation, this being the correct spelling in Swedish.

Nordstrom's official Medal of Honor citation reads:
For gallant conduct upon the occasion of the disastrous fire of accidentally ignited powder charges, which occurred in the forward turret of USS Kearsarge during target practice on 13 April 1906. Chief Boatswain Nordstrom, then chief boatswain's mate, was among the first to enter the turret in order to assist in bringing out the injured.

Later career
On February 3, 1908, Nordstrom was appointed to the warrant officer rank of boatswain, after over ten years of service as an enlisted man. He was assigned to the Naval Torpedo Station in Newport, Rhode Island in November 1916.

World War I
Shortly after the United States' entry into World War I in 1917, he was given a temporary commission as an ensign on July 1, 1917, and was assigned to  the former German luxury liner USS Leviathan in September of the same year and served on Leviathan until April 1918. He received a temporary promotion to lieutenant (junior grade) on January 1, 1918.

In May 1918 Nordstrom was assigned to the Navy Base in New London, Connecticut fitting out a division of submarine chasers which he commanded when they were commissioned. He was promoted to temporary lieutenant on July 1, 1918. In August 1918 he was deployed to Plymouth, England and in September was reassigned to Corfu, Greece where he was assigned to Submarine Chaser Detachment Two. In October he was assigned as the aide to the commander of the 1st Submarine Chaser Squadron on board Submarine Chaser 90 until November 21, 1918.

After the war, Nordstrom reverted to his permanent rank of chief boatswain on October 28, 1919. At about the same time, he was assigned to Naval Station Newport in Rhode Island.

Death and burial
Lieutenant Nordstrom died while on active duty in 1930 at age 53.  He is buried in Arlington National Cemetery in Arlington County, Virginia with his wife, Kathryn Veronica Nordstrom (1891–1961).

Awards
Medal of Honor
Sampson Medal
Spanish Campaign Medal
World War I Victory Medal

See also

List of Medal of Honor recipients

References

1876 births
1930 deaths
Swedish emigrants to the United States
United States Navy officers
United States Navy Medal of Honor recipients
Burials at Arlington National Cemetery
Foreign-born Medal of Honor recipients
Non-combat recipients of the Medal of Honor